"Hot Nigga" (censored on the album as "Hot N*gga", edited for radio as "Hot Boy" or "Hot Ni") is the debut single by American rapper Bobby Shmurda. It was released for digital download on July 25, 2014 by Epic Records and GS9 as the lead single from Shmurda's debut EP Shmurda She Wrote. The song includes production from Jahlil Beats, which was originally used by Lloyd Banks for his 2012 song, "Jackpot". The music video contains a choreography that was later named the "Shmoney dance". The song and the video became popular in 2014 among Vine users, which led to the "Shmoney dance" phenomenon. Additionally, several unofficial remixes by various rappers have been made. The song has peaked at number six on the US Billboard Hot 100 chart, becoming the artist's first and only top 10 single in the United States. "Hot Nigga" was a commercial success, being certified Platinum in the United States.

Music video
The official music video was uploaded to Shmurda's Vevo account on August 1, 2014. The video was made in the spring of 2014 and was originally uploaded on Maine Fetti's YouTube on March 28, 2014. It was recorded in East Flatbush, Brooklyn and the video on his Vevo channel has received over 800 million views on YouTube as of July 2022.

Remixes
Freestyles by various rappers have since then been released among which are Juicy J, French Montana, Lil' Kim,Lil Wayne, Gunplay, T.I.,Jeezy, Lil Herb, Ace Hood, Chevy Crocker,  Shy Glizzy, and Problem.

Two official remixes have been released. On August 29, 2014, Shmurda released a reggae remix, featuring Junior Reid, Mavado, Popcaan and Jah X. Another remix, featuring Fabolous, Jadakiss, Chris Brown, Rowdy Rebel, Busta Rhymes and Yo Gotti was released on September 5, 2014.

In popular culture
The song and the video became popular in 2014 among Vine users, which led to the "Shmoney dance" meme (such as "Where They At Tho?", "21", and more). One line from the song, "About a week ago!" appeared in the vast majority of these Vines and played a large role in the spread of the song. In July 2014, Beyoncé did the dance move on a venue of her On the Run Tour. The move was also performed by NFL receiver Brandon Gibson after a touchdown.

Drake used the song while hosting the 2014 ESPY Awards.

Charts

Weekly charts

Year-end charts

Certifications

See also
List of number-one R&B/hip-hop songs of 2014 (U.S.)

References

2014 debut singles
2014 songs
Epic Records singles
East Coast hip hop songs
Internet memes
Gangsta rap songs
Trap music songs
Drill songs